Nacha Punthong is a Thai taekwondo practitioner. In 2010, he won the silver medal in the men's 63 kg event at the 2010 Asian Games held in Guangzhou, China. In the final, he lost against Lee Dae-hoon of South Korea.

In 2006, he competed in the men's 62 kg event at the 2006 Asian Games held in Doha, Qatar where he was eliminated in his first match, against Kim Ju-young of South Korea. The following year, he won the silver medal in the men's 62 kg event at the 2007 Summer Universiade held in Bangkok, Thailand.

References

External links 
 

Living people
Year of birth missing (living people)
Place of birth missing (living people)
Nacha Punthong
Taekwondo practitioners at the 2006 Asian Games
Taekwondo practitioners at the 2010 Asian Games
Medalists at the 2010 Asian Games
Asian Games medalists in taekwondo
Nacha Punthong
Universiade medalists in taekwondo
Universiade silver medalists for Thailand
Medalists at the 2007 Summer Universiade
Nacha Punthong